Port Los Angeles can refer to either:
Port Los Angeles Long Wharf (Santa Monica) 1894 to 1933
Port of Los Angeles at San Pedro Bay

Los Angeles Harbor Region